Allan Leavitt (born October 22, 1955) is a former American football placekicker. He played for the Tampa Bay Buccaneers in 1977.

References

1955 births
Living people
American football placekickers
Georgia Bulldogs football players
Tampa Bay Buccaneers players